Paul Reynolds may refer to:

 Paul Reynolds (actor) (born 1970), British actor
 Paul Reynolds (BBC journalist) (born 1946), BBC's World Affairs correspondent
 Paul Reynolds (commentator) (1949–2010), Scottish-New Zealand internet commentator
 Paul Reynolds (cricketer) (born 1936), South African cricketer
 Paul Reynolds (musician) (born 1962), guitarist for early '80s synth pop band A Flock of Seagulls
 Paul Reynolds (RTÉ journalist), RTÉ crime correspondent
 Paul Reynolds (umpire) (born 1973), Irish cricket umpire
 Paul D. Reynolds (1963–2015), Canadian investment banker
 Sled Reynolds, animal trainer for animals in film
 Paul Reynolds (badminton), member of the Ireland national badminton team (